West Berkshire Golf Club is a golf club, located in Chaddleworth, Berkshire, England. It is located about 3 miles from Woodlands St Mary. It was established in 1975. The course was designed by Robin Stagg and Paul Simpson.

References

Golf clubs and courses in Berkshire
1975 establishments in England
Chaddleworth